Carl Ferdinand von Jaenisch (Karl Andreyevich Yanish; April 11, 1813 – March 7, 1872) was a Finnish and Russian chess player and theorist. In the 1840s, he was among the top players in the world.

Life and career
Born in Vyborg, he began a military career in Finland, but soon moved to Russia to teach rational mechanics in Petersburg (now Saint Petersburg). He dedicated his life to mathematics and chess, two subjects which he considered closely related. He tried to show their connections in his work Découvertes sur le cavalier (aux échecs), published in Petersburg in 1837.

In 1842–43, he published a book on the openings in two volumes: Analyse Nouvelle des ouvertures. In 1862–63, he published his major work: Traité des applications de l'analyse mathématique au jeu des échecs, in three volumes.

He wanted to take part in the London 1851 chess tournament, but arrived late and instead played a match with Howard Staunton, which he lost +2–7=1. Three years later, he also lost to Ilya Shumov (+3–5=4).

Legacy

Jaenisch is best remembered for having analysed and helped develop Petrov's Defence with Alexander Petrov, and for his work on the Schliemann–Jaenisch Gambit of the Ruy Lopez, which begins 1.e4 e5 2.Nf3 Nc6 3.Bb5 f5!? 

The postmodern gambit 1. c4 b5!? is the Jaenisch Gambit, but while Jaenisch mentioned this move, he did not advocate it.

Staunton was most upset at his death in 1872, writing to Tassilo von Heydebrand und der Lasa in November of that year: I was sorry to lose Lewis and St. Amant, my dear friends Bolton and Sir T. Madden, and others of whom we have been deprived, but for Jaenisch I entertained a particular affection, and his loss was proportionately painful to me. He was truly an amiable and an upright man.

After Jaenisch's death, a scholarship fund in his honor, which survives to this day, was established by his sister.

References

External links
 

1813 births
1872 deaths
Sportspeople from Vyborg
People from Viipuri Province (Grand Duchy of Finland)
Chess players from the Russian Empire
Chess theoreticians
19th-century chess players